Professor M. Aslam served as Vice Chancellor of the Indira Gandhi National Open University. He  also served as Chairman of Distance Education Council of India  Aslam spent about 26 years as professor at Indira Gandhi National Open University. He earlier served as Founder Director (Trg) at the Centre on Integrated Rural Development for Asia & the Pacific (CIRDAP), based in Dhaka for 8 years between 1981-88. CIRDAP  is a regional,  inter-governmental  and  international  organisation   established  in  1979  by  the   countries of the Asia-Pacific region at  the  initiative of the FAO of the United Nations. Prof. M. Aslam has rich and varied experience both at national and international levels from his 41 years career in:
•	Multi-Media in Distance Education; 
•	ICT, Communication and Extension; 
•	University Administration; 
•	Rural Development & Panchayti Raj
•	Distance & Continuing Education; 
•	Training Methodology; Training skills; and 
•	Transactional Analysis  
Dr Aslam served as consultant/Expert to : FAO and UNDP of the United Nations; EDI of the World Bank; Commonwealth Advisory Services, Inc, Philippines; NISTADS; UNESCO; ADB/Price Waterhouse; AARRO; UPSC;  ESCWA of the United Nations; Commonwealth of learning and others. He served as visiting faculty to as many as 20 institutions in India and abroad  
He has authored 8 books and hundreds of papers. One of his books The Challenge of Education and Training’- Strengthening    Existing Systems and Road Ahead’,  Concept Publishing Pvt. Ltd .New Delhi was released  at IIC on 5 June 2013 by Union Human Resource Development Minister, Govt. of India. His another book 2.	‘Panchayat Raj in India’ – published by   National Book  Trust of India New Delhi, 2007 has been also translated by NBT in to 3 languages. (Hindi, Urdu & Tamil).One of his papers on "Training Millions – Pedagogical Challenges for Distance Education" was published in  "Open Learning" Vol. 15 No.3, 2000, of  UK Open University. 
He has visited 35 countries across the world.

Academic career 
M.A. in Sociology with First Division and Second Position.(1973)
M.Phil. in 1975
Ph.D. (Sociology) in 1978.

Awards 
 served as visiting faculty to 16 institutions in India and abroad.
 Fellow of the Economic Development Institute of the World Bank.
 Distinguished Fellow" The Academy of Grassroots Studies and Research of India (AGRASRI), Tirupati (2017- till date)
COL President’s Award of Excellence at PAN Commonwealth Forum in March, 1999, held in Brunei, Darussalam.   
SONY International Award (1999
Professional Excellence Award’ 2007
‘Best Teaching Practices’ Award conferred on IGNOU at the ‘India Today Aspire Education Summit 2012 
Social Responsibility Award" for his selfless Service to the Society and Mankind by Bharat Nirman on 8 June 2013 at India Habitate Centre, New Delhi. 
" Amity Academic Excellence Award" by  Prof. Nick Petford, Vice Chancellor, The University of Northampton, UK during  INBUSH ERA-16, International Business Summit & Research Conference organized by Amity University during 3–5 February 2016 .

References

Living people
Academic staff of Indira Gandhi National Open University
Year of birth missing (living people)